Donald MacLean, 1st Laird of Brolas (c. 1600 – after 1655), was a Scottish Laird of Clan MacLean who fought in the battle of Battle of Inverkeithing. He was the first Laird of Brolas.

Early years
His father was Hector Og Maclean, 15th Clan Chief and his mother was a daughter of Sir Archibald Acheson, 1st Baronet. Donald was the first son of Hector's second marriage. His brother was John Hans Makeléer.

Marriage and children
He married Florence Maclean, the daughter of John Garbh Maclean, 7th Laird of Coll and had the following children:
Lauchlan Maclean, 2nd Laird of Brolas, who was the Member of Parliament for Argyllshire. His descendant, Sir Allan Maclean, 6th Baronet, became the Clan Chief when the previous chief died without an heir.
Mor Maclean of Brolas
Hector Og Maclean of Brolas, who married Janet, daughter of MacNeil of Barra. He had a son, John Maclean of Brolas who married Finovia of Garmony. John Maclean of Brolas then had as his son, Donald Maclean of Brolas who married and had Sir Hector Maclean, 7th Baronet. Donald married a second time and had Sir Fitzroy Jeffreys Grafton Maclean, 8th Baronet.

Sexual misconduct allegations
In 2018, several women came out with allegations against Maclean in a 20-page Google Docs document, alleging sexual abuse. Maclean has denied all allegations and no charges have been pressed.

Ancestors

References

Donald
Donald
1600s births
17th-century deaths
17th-century Scottish people
Scottish soldiers